John P. Barrett (November 17, 1915 – March 27, 2000) was an American Democratic politician who served in the Missouri General Assembly.  He served in the Missouri Senate between 1955 and 1967.

Born in St. Louis, Missouri, he was educated in the public schools of St. Louis.  On August 29, 1934, Barrett married Dolores Mabel Miller in St. Louis, Missouri.  He served in the United States Navy, in the South Pacific, during World War II.

References

External links
 The Political Graveyard: Index to Politicians, Barre to Barrett
 John P. "Jack" Barrett, Find a Grave

1915 births
2000 deaths
United States Navy personnel of World War II
20th-century American politicians
Democratic Party Missouri state senators